Tansa dam, is an earthfill and gravity dam on Tansa river near Mumbai, Thane district in the state of Maharashtra in India. The dam is one of the seven sources of drinking water to the city of Mumbai.

Specifications

Purpose
 Water supply
 Drinking water

See also
 Dams in Maharashtra
 List of reservoirs and dams in India

References

Dams in Thane district
Dams completed in 1892
1892 establishments in India